The following is a list of events of the year 2023 in the United States, as well as predicted and scheduled events that have not yet occurred.

Incumbents

Federal government 
President: Joe Biden (D-Delaware)
Vice President: Kamala Harris (D-California)
Chief Justice: John Roberts (New York)
Speaker of the House: Nancy Pelosi (D-California) (until January 3), Kevin McCarthy (R-California) (since January 7)
Senate Majority Leader: Chuck Schumer (D-New York)
Congress: 117th (until January 3), 118th (since January 3)

Elections 

Elections will be held on November 7, 2023. This is an off-year election where neither the president or vice president is on the ballot. Seats in the US Congress are not up for election either, save for special elections.

Kentucky, Louisiana, and Mississippi will hold elections for their governors, lieutenant governors, state treasurers, attorney generals, and state agriculture commissioners. The cities of Chicago, Columbus, Dallas, Denver, Houston, Indianapolis, Jacksonville, Memphis, Nashville, Philadelphia, and Salt Lake City will elect their mayors.

Special elections 
February 21: A special election was held to fill the vacancy in Virginia's 4th congressional district left by Democrat Donald McEachin, who died on November 28, 2022. Democrat Jennifer McClellan wins the election to serve out the remainder of McEachin's term.

Events

January 
 January 1
 Books, films, and other works published in 1927 enter the public domain.
 The FDA designates sesame allergies as one of the major food allergens.
 January 2 – 2022 NFL season: Buffalo Bills player Damar Hamlin collapses from cardiac arrest after a tackle, causing the Bills' game against the Cincinnati Bengals to be cancelled and deemed as a no contest.
 January 3
 The 118th United States Congress convenes following the 2022 midterm elections. For the next four days, fifteen sessions transpire to determine the Speaker of the United States House of Representatives. This is the first time that a House speaker was not determined by an initial vote in exactly one hundred years. 
 Keenan Anderson dies after being repeatedly tased by the Los Angeles Police Department. 
 The final of several related shootings which allegedly target Democrats occurs at the home of a Democratic politician in Albuquerque, New Mexico. There are no deaths or injuries.
 Amber McLaughlin becomes the first transgender death row inmate executed in the United States 
 January 4
 European Union regulators issue a 414 million dollar fine against Meta Platforms for violating the General Data Protection Regulation on Facebook and Instagram.
 A mass shooting occurs inside a house in Enoch, Utah. Eight members of a single family, consisting of three adults and five children, are killed, with their bodies being found by police during a welfare check.
 January 5
 The South Carolina Supreme Court strikes down the state's six-week abortion ban, ruling it violates the state's constitution.
 The Idaho Supreme Court upholds the state's ban on abortion in a 3–2 ruling.
 January 6
 A sixteen-judge panel on the United States Court of Appeals for the Fifth Circuit blocks a federal ban on bump stocks.
 A six-year-old student shoots and injures his teacher at school in Newport News, Virginia.
 January 7
 13-year-old Karon Blake is fatally shot in Washington D.C. just before 4 a.m. in the 1000 block of Quincy Street, NE.
 After four days and fifteen ballots, Representative Kevin McCarthy is elected the 55th Speaker of the House of Representatives.
 San Francisco's Central Subway enters full revenue service.
 Five black police officers of the Memphis Police Department, severely beat Tyre Nichols, a 29-year-old Black man, during a traffic stop. Nichols dies due to his injuries on January 10, and his death causes outrage and protests across the country.
 January 8
 Immigration policy of the Joe Biden administration: President Joe Biden visits the Mexico–United States border for the first time during his presidency.
 Senator Ben Sasse resigns to become the president-designate of the University of Florida.
 January 9
 The investigation into the failed attempt to overturn the 2020 United States presidential election by former President Donald Trump in Fulton County, Georgia completes its work and the special grand jury submits its report on the matter.
 The University of Georgia Bulldogs win the 2023 College Football Playoff National Championship at SoFi Stadium in Inglewood, California. Georgia defeats Texas Christian University by a score of 65–7, the largest victory in college bowl game history.
 January 10
 Allen Weisselberg is sentenced to five months in jail for a decade-long tax fraud scheme involving the Trump Organization.
 The 80th Golden Globe Awards ceremony takes place in Beverly Hills, California.
 January 11 – 2023 FAA system outage: For the first time since 9/11, the Federal Aviation Administration issues a nationwide ground stop following the failure of the FAA's NOTAM system.
 January 12 – Joe Biden classified documents incident: Attorney general Merrick Garland appoints Robert Hur to investigate mishandling of classified documents by President Biden.
 January 12–22 – The 2023 Winter World University Games are held in Lake Placid, New York.
 January 16 – A baby, a teenager, and four others are killed in a mass shooting at a home in Goshen, California, by alleged cartel members.
 January 18 – The US Virgin Islands legalizes marijuana, becoming the third US territory and 25th US jurisdiction overall to do so.
 January 19 – Trade union membership hits an all-time low in US dropping from 10.3% to 10.1%.
 January 21 – A mass shooting occurs at a dance studio in Monterey Park, California, after a Lunar New Year celebration. Eleven people are killed, and nine more are injured; the perpetrator commits suicide the following day.
 January 23
 Five January 6 United States Capitol attack participants, four Oath Keepers as well as the person who laid his feet on Speaker Nancy Pelosi's desk, are convicted on all their respective charges.
 A spree of mass shootings in Half Moon Bay, California kills seven farmworkers.
 January 24 – Classified documents are revealed to be found at the home of former Vice President Mike Pence.
 January 27 – Protests begin after the Memphis Police Department releases a footage of officers beating Tyre Nichols to death. Following the release of the footage, the department disbands its SCORPION unit while the Memphis Fire Services dismisses three personnel for failing to render aid.
 January 31–February 2 – A massive ice storm over the Southern United States kills 10 people.

February 
February 1
Tampa Bay Buccaneers quarterback Tom Brady announces his retirement from the NFL.
Joe Biden classified documents incident: The FBI conducts a planned search of President Biden's home in Rehoboth Beach, Delaware.
The Federal Reserve raises interest rates by 0.25 percent from 4.5 percent to 4.75 percent.
February 2
In a party-line vote, the House of Representatives ousts Representative Ilhan Omar from the House Committee on Foreign Affairs due to remarks that she had previously made regarding Israeli policy that many deemed as antisemitic.
In United States v. Rahimi, the Fifth Circuit Court of Appeals rules that a federal law which criminalizes the possession of a firearm by an individual who is subject to a restraining order for domestic violence is unconstitutional.
2023 Chinese balloon incident: Defense officials announce that a suspected Chinese surveillance balloon is being tracked over the western United States.
February 3 
Recreational cannabis sales begin in Missouri.
 A train carrying dangerous chemicals derails outside of East Palestine, Ohio, creating a large environmental disaster situation. 
February 4
The suspected Chinese spy balloon is shot down by a missile off the coast of South Carolina.
 The 2023 National Hockey League All-Star Game is held at the FLA Live Arena in Sunrise, Florida, with the Atlantic Division winning. The arena was originally supposed to hold the 2021 All Star Game but it was cancelled due to the COVID-19 pandemic.
 February 5 
 The NFL's first iteration of the Pro Bowl Games is held at Allegiant Stadium in Paradise, Nevada. The NFC wins 35–33.
 The 65th Annual Grammy Awards returns to Crypto.com Arena in Los Angeles, California, after being away for three years due to the COVID-19 pandemic and various scheduling conflicts. "About Damn Time" by Lizzo wins Record of the Year, Harry's House  by Harry Styles wins Album of the Year, while Beyoncé wins her 32nd award to become the most winning artist of all time.
February 7 
 President Biden gives his second official State of the Union Address to Congress.
 LeBron James breaks the all time NBA scoring record, scoring 38,388 points. The record was previously held by Hall of Famer Kareem Abdul-Jabbar.
February 9 
 Former Vice President Pence is subpoenaed by a special counsel leading investigations into former President Trump.
 The United States military shoots down a high altitude object over Alaska. 
February 10 – Mike Pence classified documents incident: The FBI conducts a search of former Vice President Pence's home and finds an additional classified document.
February 11 – The United States military, under orders of President Biden, shoots down a high altitude object over Yukon, Canada.
 February 12
 The United States military shoots down an unidentified object over Lake Huron, the third in less than a week.
 2022 NFL season: The Kansas City Chiefs defeat the Philadelphia Eagles by a score of 38–35 to win Super Bowl LVII. Quarterback Patrick Mahomes wins Super Bowl MVP.
February 13 
Georgia judge Robert C.I. McBurney approves the release of parts of a grand jury inquiry investigating former President Trump's effort to overturn election results in Georgia.
A mass shooting is carried out at Michigan State University. Three students were killed in the attack and five others injured. The shooter committed suicide as he was being approached by police.
 February 14 – 2024 United States presidential election – Republican Nikki Haley announces her 2024 presidential campaign.
 February 17 – A shooting spree takes place in Arkabutla, Mississippi, killing six people and injuring one other person. The suspect is later arrested.
 February 18 – The Carter Center announces that former President Jimmy Carter has entered hospice care.
 February 19 
 The 2023 Daytona 500 takes place at the Daytona International Speedway in Daytona Beach, Florida, beginning the 2023 NASCAR Cup Series.
 The 2023 NBA All-Star Game is held at Vivint Arena in Salt Lake City, Utah. Team Giannis wins 184–175 against Team LeBron.
 February 20 – Marjorie Taylor Greene advocated  a "national divorce" between red states and blue states. She further suggested that red states disenfranchise people that move from blue states, for a period of five years to the condemnation of Democrats and some Republicans including Spencer Cox, Liz Cheney, and Mitt Romney. 
 February 21 – Entrepreneur Vivek Ramaswamy announces his candidacy for president in the 2024 election.
February 21–February 24 – A massive winter storm causes extreme wind and rain on the West Coast of the United States, while bringing extreme blizzard conditions to the Midwest and Northeast.
 February 23
 Florida executes death row inmate Donald Dillbeck, ending a three-year hiatus on executions.
 The syndicated Dilbert comic strip is dropped by many newspapers, most notably the Los Angeles Times, The Washington Post, and USA Today, after creator Scott Adams posts a video in which he characterized Black people as a "hate group".

March 

 March 2
 Trial of Alex Murdaugh: Alex Murdaugh is convicted by a jury and sentenced to life in prison without parole the next day for the murders of both his wife and son as well as two gun charges.
 Tennessee governor Bill Lee signs a controversial bill that bans "drag performances" in the state.
 March 3 – Walgreens announces that it will not sell abortion pills in states where Republican officials threaten to take legal action.
 March 6 – Texas state Representative Bryan Slaton introduced HB 3596, the "Texas Independence Referendum Act" (TEXIT), which would allow for a referendum to investigate the secession of Texas from the United States.
 March 8 
 Minnesota Governor Tim Walz signs an executive order to protect gender-affirming healthcare.
 March 2023 United States bank failures: Silvergate Bank, a bank that dealt mostly in cryptocurrency, announces its plan to liquidate and effectively ceases operations after it failed to remain solvent due to a tumultuous cryptocurrency market.
 March 9 – The bodies of murdered tourists Shaeed Woodard and Zindell Brown are returned to the United States after their party was kidnapped by cartel members in the border city of Matamoros, Mexico while on a medical trip. Eric Williams and Latavia "Tay" McGee, the other members of the group, were rescued two days prior by local security forces.
 March 10 – In the largest bank failure since the 2007–2008 financial crisis, Silicon Valley Bank, with $212 billion in assets, becomes the second bank to fail this month after it is shuttered by regulators after a bank run leads to its collapse.
 March 12 
The 95th Academy Awards, hosted by Jimmy Kimmel, are held at the Dolby Theatre in Los Angeles. Daniel Kwan and Daniel Scheinert's Everything Everywhere All at Once lead the nominations with eleven. The film wins seven of those awards, including Best Picture, Best Director, Michelle Yeoh for Best Actress, Ke Huy Quan for Best Supporting Actor, Jamie Lee Curtis for Best Supporting Actress, Best Original Screenplay, and Best Film Editing. The telecast, not counting streaming views, garnered 18.7 million views, a slight increase from the previous ceremony.
Signature Bank collapses and becomes the third bank in five days to fail. With $110 billion in assets, it is the third largest bank failure in American history.
 March 13 – The controversial Willow project is approved in Alaska.
 March 14 – The March 2023 nor'easter took electricity from more than 250,000 buildings.
 March 18 – Former President Donald Trump announces via social media that he expects to be arrested on March 21 stemming from a Manhattan district attorney investigation into hush money payments to porn actress Stormy Daniels.

Predicted and scheduled events 

 August – The RNC will hold the first primary debate in Milwaukee, Wisconsin.

Deaths

See also 

 2023 in American music
 2023 in American soccer
 2023 in American television
 List of American films of 2023
 List of mass shootings in the United States in 2023

References

External links 
 

 
United States
United States
2020s in the United States
Years of the 21st century in the United States